The purple-capped fruit dove or Pohnpei fruit dove (Ptilinopus ponapensis), is a species of bird in the family Columbidae found on Chuuk and Pohnpei in the Caroline Islands. It was formerly considered as a subspecies of the crimson-crowned fruit dove. Its natural habitats are subtropical or tropical moist lowland forests and subtropical or tropical mangrove forests.

References

Cibois, A., J.-C. Thibault, C. Bonillo, C.E. Filardi, D. Watling, and E. Pasquet. 2014. Phylogeny and biogeography of the fruit doves (Aves: Columbidae). Molecular Phylogenetics and Evolution 70: 442–453.

Ptilinopus
Birds described in 1878